Pentathemis membranulata is a species of dragonfly in the family Corduliidae, 
known as the metallic tigerhawk. It is endemic to rivers, streams, and lagoons in the Top End of Australia's Northern Territory.

Pentathemis membranulata is a small to medium-sized, metallic-black and yellow dragonfly.
Young females have dark wingtips.

Gallery

See also
 List of dragonflies of Australia

References

Corduliidae
Odonata of Australia
Endemic fauna of Australia
Taxa named by Ferdinand Karsch
Insects described in 1890